Polemon collaris, or the collared snake-eater, is a species of venomous rear-fanged snake in the family Atractaspididae. It is endemic to Africa.

Geographic range
It is found in Angola, Burundi, Cameroon, Central African Republic, Democratic Republic of the Congo, Equatorial Guinea, Gabon, Nigeria, Rwanda, and Uganda.

Description
Polemon collaris is blackish dorsally down to the outer ends of the ventrals and subcaudals. The head and the nape of the neck are pale brown, with some black blotches on the crown and below the eye. Ventrally it is white. The entire terminal caudal shield is white.

Dorsal scales smooth, without apical pits, arranged in 15 rows. Ventrals 201–208; anal plate divided; subcaudals 16–22, also divided.

Diameter of eye about three fifths its distance from the mouth. Rostral broader than high, barely visible from above. Internasals considerably shorter than the prefrontals. Frontal slightly broader than the supraocular, 1½ times as long as broad, as long as its distance from the rostral, much shorter than the parietals. Nasal divided, in contact with the preocular. Usually two postoculars. Temporals 1+1 or 1+2. Seven upper labials, third and fourth entering the eye. First lower labial forming a suture with its fellow behind the mental. Four or five lower labials in contact with the anterior chin shield. Two pairs of chin shields, the anterior pair longer than the posterior pair.

Subspecies
Three subspecies are recognized including the nominate race.

Polemon collaris brevior (de Witte & Laurent, 1947)
Polemon collaris collaris (Peters, 1881)
Polemon collaris longior (de Witte & Laurent, 1947)

Footnotes

References
Peters, W. 1881. Ueber zwei neue von v. Mechow gesammelte Schlangen nebst einer Uebersicht der von ihn mitgebrachten herpetologischen Sammlung. Sitzungs-Berichte der Gesellschaft Naturforschender Freunde zu Berlin 9:147-150.
de Witte, G.F. & R.F. Laurent. 1947. Revision d'un groupe de Colubridae africains:genres Calamelaps, Miodon, Aparallactus, et formes affines. Mém. Mus. Roy. Hist. Nat. Belgique (sér. 2) 29: 1–134.

External Links
iNaturalist page

Atractaspididae
Reptiles described in 1881
Taxa named by Wilhelm Peters